Mallory Franklin (born 19 June 1994) is a British slalom canoeist who has competed internationally since 2009. She competes in both Kayak (K1/seated double-blade paddle) and Canadian Canoe (C1/kneeling single-blade paddle) classes, as well as the Extreme Canoe (XC) discipline.

She won silver at the 2020 Summer Olympics in the Women's C1 event. She is a five-time World and seven-time European champion, with particular success in team events.

Franklin has won 13 medals in total at the ICF Canoe Slalom World Championships with five golds (C1: 2017, C1 team: 2017, 2018, K1 team: 2019, 2021), five silvers (C1: 2013, 2014, 2018, 2021; K1: 2018) and three bronzes (C1: 2022, K1 team: 2018, C1 team: 2022). She has also won 17 medals at the European Championships (7 golds, 7 silvers and 3 bronzes).

Franklin won the overall World Cup title in the C1 class in 2016 and in the Extreme K1 in 2022.

Results

World Cup individual podiums

Complete World Cup results

References

External links

Living people
English female canoeists
1994 births
British female canoeists
Sportspeople from Windsor, Berkshire
Medalists at the ICF Canoe Slalom World Championships
Medalists at the 2020 Summer Olympics
Canoeists at the 2020 Summer Olympics
Olympic medalists in canoeing
Olympic silver medallists for Great Britain
Olympic canoeists of Great Britain
20th-century British women
21st-century British women